China International Eco-City Forum is an annual international exhibition, first held in 2010. The permanent topic of the forum is "Eco-city will create a harmonious future."

References

External links 
 

Environmental conferences